The George Washington Carver High School Home Economics Building is a historic school building at 900 Pearl Street (between 9th and 10th Streets) in Augusta, Arkansas.  It is a single-story L-shaped concrete block structure with a gable roof and modest vernacular styling.  Built in 1944 with funding by local subscription, it is the only one of five buildings built between 1917 and 1948 for the education of Augusta's African-American population.  The school remained segregated until integration took place in 1970, and has been used since then to house the local Head Start Program.

The building was listed on the National Register of Historic Places in 2004.

See also
National Register of Historic Places listings in Woodruff County, Arkansas

References

School buildings on the National Register of Historic Places in Arkansas
School buildings completed in 1944
Education in Woodruff County, Arkansas
National Register of Historic Places in Woodruff County, Arkansas
1944 establishments in Arkansas
Home economics education
African-American history of Arkansas
Augusta, Arkansas